Five ships of the Royal Navy have borne the name HMS Staunch:

 was a 12-gun gunvessel launched in 1797, purchased later that year, and sold in 1803.
 was a 12-gun gun-brig launched in 1804 and wrecked in 1811.
 was an  wooden screw gunboat launched in 1856 and sold in 1866.
 was an iron screw gunboat launched in 1867 and sold in 1904.
 was an  launched in 1910 and sunk in 1917.

References

Royal Navy ship names